Ag Shame Lovey is the debut solo studio album by South African singer Brenda Fassie. It was released in June 1987 through CCP Records. During the recording of Brenda and the Big Dudes last album Touch Somebody (EP) (1986), the group announced that they were disbanding. The album sold 200 000 albums in 1987 and received many accolades. .

Ag Shame Lovey received generally positive reviews from music critics; the album is most notable for her single "Ag Shame Lovey".

Personnel
Brenda Fassie - lead vocals (all tracks)
Rufus Vuyi Klaas - guitar
Desmond Molotana - keyboards

Track listing
Credits adapted from AllMusic

References

Brenda Fassie albums
1987 debut albums